Mimaderpas anteaureus is a species of beetle in the family Cerambycidae, and the only species in the genus Mimaderpas. It was described by Breuning in 1973.

References

Acanthocinini
Beetles described in 1973
Monotypic beetle genera